This is a list of television programmes currently, rerunning and formerly on Boomerang in Southeast Asia.

Current programming
As of March 2023:

 Be Cool, Scooby-Doo!
 Ben 10 (2016)
 Bunnicula
 Chowder
 Foster's Home for Imaginary Friends
 Grizzy and The Lemmings (also aired on Cartoon Network)
 Journey Of Long
 The Looney Tunes Show
 Mighty Mike
 The Powerpuff Girls (2016)
 Taffy
 Talking Tom and Friends
 Tom and Jerry Tales
 Tom and Jerry Theatricals

Cartoonito programming 
 Alice & Lewis
 Batwheels
 Brave Bunnies
 Bugs Bunny Builders
 Esme & Roy
 Mecha Builders
 Monchhichi Tribe
 Mumfie
 Ranger Rob

Former Programming

 2 Stupid Dogs
 The 13 Ghosts of Scooby-Doo
 ABC Monsters
 The Addams Family
 The Adventures of Chuck and Friends
 ALF: The Animated Series
 Angelo Rules
 Animaniacs
 Astro and the Space Mutts
 Atom Ant
 Atomic Betty
 Augie Doggie and Doggie Daddy
 Barbie Dreamhouse Adventures
 Barbie Dreamtopia
 Ben 10 (2005)
 Birdman and the Galaxy Trio
 Booba
 Camp Lazlo
 Captain Caveman and the Teen Angels
 Captain Planet and the Planeteers
 Care Bears: Adventures in Care-a-Lot
 Care Bears: Welcome to Care-a-Lot
 Casper and the Angels
 Cattanooga Cats
 Cave Kids
 Challenge of the GoBots
 Chloe's Closet
 Cow and Chicken
 Dastardly and Muttley in their Flying Machines
 Dexter's Laboratory
 The Doozers
 Dorothy and the Wizard of Oz
 DreamWorks Dragons
 Droopy
 Droopy: Master Detective
 Duck Dodgers
 Dumb and Dumber
 Dynomutt, Dog Wonder
 Ethelbert the Tiger
 Fangface
 Fantastic Four
 Fantastic Max
 The Flintstones
 Foofur
 Frankenstein Jr. and The Impossibles
 The Garfield Show
 The Great Grape Ape Show
 Generator Rex
 The Grim Adventures of Billy & Mandy
 Hanna-Barbera's Cartoon Corral
 Heathcliff and Dingbat
 Heathcliff and Marmaduke
 Hokey Wolf
 Hong Kong Phooey
 Horrid Henry
 Horseland
 I Am Weasel
 Inch High, Private Eye
 Inspector Gadget
 Inspector Gadget (2015)
 Jabberjaw
 The Jetsons
 Johnny Bravo
 Johnny Test
 Jonny Quest
 Josie and the Pussycats
 Josie and the Pussycats in Outer Space
 The Jungle Bunch
 Kingdom Force
 Krypto the Superdog
 Laff-A-Lympics
 Lamput
 Lego Friends
 The Life and Times of Juniper Lee
 Lippy the Lion & Hardy Har Har
 Little Baby Bum
 Little Red Tractor
 Loonatics Unleashed
 Looney Tunes
 Loopdidoo
 Loopy de Loop
 Madeline
 The Magic School Bus
 Magilla Gorilla
 Maisy
 Marcus Level
 Masha and the Bear
 Masha's Spooky Stories
 Masha's Tales
 The Mask: Animated Series
 The Marvelous Misadventures of Flapjack
 Master Raindrop
 Matt's Monsters
 Max & Ruby
 Maya & Miguel
 Mew Mew Power
 MGM
 Miffy and Friends
 Mr. T
 Monchhichis
 Mr. Bean: The Animated Series
 My Gym Partner's a Monkey
 My Knight and Me
 My Little Pony: Pony Life
 My Little Pony: Friendship Is Magic
 My Spy Family
 New Looney Tunes
 The New Scooby-Doo Movies
 The New Scooby and Scrappy-Doo Show
 Oggy and the Cockroaches
 Pac-Man
 Paddington Bear
 Pat the Dog
 Paw Paws
 The Perils of Penelope Pitstop
 Pingu in the City
 The Pink Panther Show
 Pink Panther & Pals
 Running Man (also aired on Cartoon Network)
 The Pirates of Dark Water
 Pixie & Dixie
 Police Academy: The Animated Series
 Popeye
 Postman Pat
 Pound Puppies
 The Powerpuff Girls (Classic)
 Powerpuff Girls Z
 Puppy in My Pocket: Adventures in Pocketville
 Puppy''s New Adventures
 Quick Draw McGraw
 The Real Adventures of Jonny Quest
 Richie Rich
 Ricochet Rabbit & Droop-a-Long
 The Road Runner Show
 Roger
 The Ruff & Reddy Show
 Sabrina: The Animated Series
 Sabrina's Secret Life
 Samurai Jack
 Scooby-Doo and Scrappy-Doo
 Scooby-Doo and Scrappy-Doo
 Scooby-Doo! Mystery Incorporated
 The Scooby-Doo Show
 Scooby-Doo and Guess Who?
 Scooby-Doo, Where Are You!
 The Secret World of Benjamin Bear
 Shaggy & Scooby-Doo Get a Clue!
 Shaun the Sheep
 Sheep in the Big City
 Shugo Chara!
 Shirt Tales
 Skatoony
 The Smurfs
 Snagglepuss
 Snooper and Blabber
 Sonic Boom
 Space Ghost and Dino Boy
 Speed Buggy
 Speed Racer
 Strawberry Shortcake
 Strawberry Shortcake's Berry Bitty Adventures
 Super Friends
 Super Simple Songs
 SWAT Kats: The Radical Squadron
 The Sylvester and Tweety Mysteries
 Takeshi's Castle
 Talking Tom Heroes (moved to Cartoon Network)
 Thomas and Friends
 ThunderCats
 Time Squad
 Tiny Toon Adventures
 Touche Turtle and Dum Dum
 The Looney Tunes Show
 The Tom and Jerry Comedy Show
 Tom and Jerry Kids
 The Tom and Jerry Show (1975)
 The Tom and Jerry Show (2014) (also aired on Cartoon Network)
 Top Cat
 The Transformers
 Turbo FAST
 Unikitty
 Wacky Races
 Wait Till Your Father Gets Home
 Wally Gator
 We Bare Bears (currently aired on Cartoon Network)
 What's New, Scooby-Doo?
 Winx Club
 Woody Woodpecker
 Yabba Dabba Dinosaurs
 Yakky Doodle
 Yo Yogi!
 Yogi Bear
 Yogi's Gang
 Yogi's Space Race
 Yogi's Treasure Hunt
 Young Robin Hood

Cartoonito
 Baby Looney Tunes
 Dino Ranch
 Lucas the Spider
 Mush-Mush and the Mushables

See also 
 List of programmes broadcast by Pogo
 List of programs broadcast by Cartoon Network (Asian TV channel)

References 

Boomerang (TV network)
Lists of television series by network
Mass media in Southeast Asia